Gabriel Garran (pseudonym of Gabriel Gersztenkorn; 3 May 1929 – 6 May 2022) was a French actor and theatre director.

Biography 
Born to a French Jewish family of Polish origins in Paris, he fled persecution in Vichy France at the age of 11. After World War II, he became an actor and in 1965 founded the 'Théâtre de la Commune' in Aubervilliers, the first permanent theater in French suburbs. He managed that theater in the years 1960–1984 and staged numerous plays in it. At the end of the 1970s, Garran founded the Théâtre International de Langue Française (TILF) which focused on presenting plays from African French-speaking countries.

Cinema

Assistant director 
 1962: Adieu Philippine, directed by Jacques Rozier
 1962: Janine, short film by Maurice Pialat

Director 
 1983: Brûler les planches

Books 
 Le Rire Du Fou. Paris: C. Bourgois, 1976. 
 Géographie française. Paris: Flammarion, 2014. 
 Filiation. Paris: Riveneuve. 2017.

References

External links 
 
 
 
 Garran reads from his poems in Kliclo's atelier 

1929 births
2022 deaths
French male actors
French theatre managers and producers
French theatre directors
French film directors
French people of Polish-Jewish descent